Sirja (also Romanized as Sīrjā; also known as Sīrjāh and Sīrjeh) is a village in Bahu Kalat Rural District, Dashtiari District, Chabahar County, Sistan and Baluchestan Province, Iran. At the 2006 census, its population was 280, in 69 families.

References 

Populated places in Chabahar County